The Fear Inside is a 1992 thriller/drama television film starring Christine Lahti, Dylan McDermott and Jennifer Rubin, directed by Leon Ichaso. The film first aired on August 9, 1992 on the Showtime Cable Network.

The film was nominated for two CableACE awards, one being "Actress in a Movie or Miniseries" (Christine Lahti), and the other being "Directing a Movie or Miniseries" (Leon Ichaso).

Plot
Agoraphobic children's book illustrator Meredith Cole is unable to leave her own home, and since her husband leaves, she decides to place an ad in the paper for someone to rent her guest bedroom. Jane Caswell rents the room, whilst her alleged brother Pete Caswell soon joins the household too, although it becomes clear that they are both not what they seem. Jane claims she's a vet and her brother claims he's a cop. Things go to extremes when Cole finds evidence of their criminal activity, leading the two young psychos-in-love to terrorize her. When Jane kidnaps and threatens to kill Cole's son, she has no choice but to overcome her paralyzing fears and attempt to leave her home to save him.

Cast
 Christine Lahti as Meredith Cole
 Dylan McDermott as Pete Caswell
 Jennifer Rubin as Jane Caswell
 David Ackroyd as Brandon Cole
 Thomas Ian Nicholas as Sean Cole
 Paul Linke as Carl Landers
 Mike Barger as Carlos Salcido
 Gloria McCord as Carolyn Lancaster

Reception
Upon release, Los Angeles Times gave a favorable review and wrote: "...the production is a cut or two above most suspense stories because of the gripping performances and a script that takes the old premise of a victim trapped in her house and turns it into a crackling sexual/psychological shocker." People gave a C− grade and described the film as a "routine thriller". They commented: "Woman-in-peril movies show up on TV as often as Dan Quayle jokes. There are a few tense moments, thanks to Rubin's manic-performance and some noir-ish camera work. The excitement evaporates as the story becomes increasingly predictable. When the movie gels down to its big finish, it has become more silly than scary. The ending goes on forever, with Lahti continually breaking free from these wackos and then getting recaptured. Viewer interest is likely to wane long before Lahti gets around to tackling her fear of the outdoors."

Entertainment Weekly wrote an unfavorable review, stating: "How a fine actress like Christine Lahti got involved in a miserable project like The Fear Inside is one of the mysteries of summer-doldrums TV." Describing the storyline as a "stretch", the reviewer added: "...still, there is unexpected humor: as Rubin's character becomes more and more criminally insane, her hair goes wild in a Phyllis Diller-ish way and her eyes bug out like Michael Keaton's in Beetlejuice. Now, that's entertainment." On the UK VHS release, the Los Angeles Times also quoted "gripping performances - coiled like a spring". On the same cover, New York Daily News wrote: "Not a film for the faint of heart". Both the TV Guide Network and Hal Erickson of AllMovie gave the film three out of five stars.

Home media
The film was released on VHS in America and the UK, with the American distribution being handled by Media Home Entertainment.

See also
 List of films featuring home invasions

References

External links
 

1992 television films
1992 films
1990s thriller drama films
American thriller drama films
Showtime (TV network) films
Viacom Pictures films
Films directed by Leon Ichaso
Films with screenplays by David Birke
1990s English-language films
1990s American films